Alverda is an Census-designated place in Indiana County, Pennsylvania, United States.

As of the 2020 census, the community had a population of 279.

Alverda has a post office; its residents use ZIP code 15710. It includes the neighborhood of Brownstown, which had, historically, been a separate village.

Demographics

At the time of the 2020 census, there were 279 people, 122 households in the community.

The population density was 260.0 people per square mile (100.4/km). There were 122 housing units at an average density of 45.9/sq mi (32.7/km).

The racial makeup of the community was 93.5% White, 0.1% African American, 0.03% American Indian or Alaska Native, and 0.4% from two or more races.

There were 122 households, 32.0% had children under the age of eighteen living with them; 49.0% were married couples living together, 18.0% had a single guardian with no spouse present, and 33.0% were non-families.

References

Census-designated places in Indiana County, Pennsylvania
Census-designated places in Pennsylvania